Clifford J. Levy (born June 15, 1967 in New Rochelle, New York) is deputy publisher of two Times company publications, the Wirecutter and The Athletic. He is a two-time Pulitzer Prize winner and considered one of the main architects of the digital transformation of The New York Times. 

Levy is a graduate of New Rochelle High School and Princeton University in 1989.

New York Times

Early career 
Levy joined The New York Times as a news assistant in 1990 and was promoted to reporter in 1992.
He served as chief of the Albany bureau as a political reporter, City Hall correspondent and Newark correspondent. Beginning in 2000, he was a special projects reporter for the Times' Metro desk.
In 2002, he wrote a series "Broken Homes" on the abuse of mentally ill adults in state-regulated homes. 
In 2003, he won the Pulitzer Prize for investigative reporting, as well as the George Polk Award.
He broke a story on New York State Medicaid fraud in 2005.

International reporting 
Levy joined the international staff of the Times in 2006 as Moscow bureau chief. He received his second Pulitzer Prize in 2011 in the category of International Reporting for his reporting on corruption in Russia in cooperation with Ellen Barry. The jury cited their "dogged reporting that put a human face on the faltering justice system in Russia, remarkably influencing the discussion inside the country.". Shortly before, in March 2011, Levy was named deputy editor of the Timess Metro section.

Newsroom leadership roles 
In 2013, two years after becoming an editor, Levy became the editorial lead on NYT Now, an app created by The Times that aimed to attract new readers by presenting a curated list of stories for a cheaper price than a full subscription. The Times made the app free in 2015 after acknowledging that it had failed to attract a significant number of new subscribers. In August 2016, the Times shelved the app.

Levy later was promoted to the masthead, serving as assistant managing editor and deputy managing editor, overseeing The Times's digital platforms. He led a number of initiatives to push the newsroom to embrace digital innovation and focus on digital audiences, including launching an experiment where editors and reporters were barred from viewing the desktop version of The Times inside the newsroom in order to get them to concentrate on mobile readers.

On at least two occasions, Levy was promoted into roles overseeing troubled parts of the Times. In 2018, he was named editor of the Metro section three months after the former editor, Wendell Jamieson, resigned following an internal investigation. In January 2021, Levy returned to the masthead as deputy managing editor, taking on a leadership role advising the audio department a month after the Times admitted to major errors in its flagship "Caliphate" podcast. One source told the New York Post that "Cliff was sent there to clean up the mess.”

Levy was reported to have been among several candidates to succeed Dean Baquet as executive editor, but did not receive the role, which went to managing editor Joe Kahn in April 2022.

After Kahn's promotion to executive editor, Levy remained on the Times's masthead as a deputy managing editor with a role said to focus on "ethical standards and journalistic independence, as well as training for editors throughout the newsroom."

Union negotiation controversy 
Levy was Kahn's representative in contract negotiations with the Times's union, whose contract expired in March 2021. Levy's mass e-mails to Times staff about the bargaining process were challenged by the union, which described his claims about company wage proposals as "false" and "sleight-of-hand."  According to the Daily Beast, during a bargaining session, reporter and union bargaining committee member Frances Robles told Levy "what the [Times] has done to your reputation breaks my heart. And it should break your heart. I feel really bad that these negotiations have turned a man who built his career on trust into a liar.”

The Times rebutted that accusation: Levy is "one of our most distinguished journalists. He is a former NewsGuid member, he has deep integrity, and he has the trust of both the company's leadership and his newsroom colleagues."

On December 7, Times journalists staged a one-day walk-out to protest what they said was the company's unwillingness to offer fair proposals, including on wages. It was the first such labor action since 2017 and the first to last a day or longer since 1978. 

On December 15, the Times announced that Levy would leave the newsroom and be appointed deputy publisher of the Wirecutter and The Athletic. The decision to move Levy out of the newsroom was "in part recognition from publisher A.G. Sulzberger of Levy’s work dealing with the tense and drawn-out negotiations," according to the Daily Beast. The timing of the move would be dependent on the pace of labor talks, the Daily Beast reported.

Family
Levy is married to the documentary filmmaker Juliane Dressner. They have three children, Danya, Arden and Emmett, and live in Park Slope, Brooklyn. In Park Slope, his children attended P.S. 321.

When Levy and his family lived in Moscow while he was a foreign correspondent, their children were enrolled in a local Russian school called the New Humanitarian School. He wrote about the experience for The New York Times Magazine, and Dressner produced and directed an accompanying short documentary for The Times's website that won a National Magazine Award.

Awards
 2012 National Magazine Award for Digital Media in Video for "My Family's Experiment in Extreme Schooling"
 2011 Pulitzer Prize for International Reporting
 2010 George Polk Award for Foreign Reporting
 2009 Robert F. Kennedy Journalism Award
 2003 Pulitzer Prize for Investigative Reporting for "Broken Homes"
 2003 George Polk Award for Regional Reporting
 1998 George Polk Award for Local Reporting

References

Writers from New Rochelle, New York
Living people
American investigative journalists
The New York Times writers
George Polk Award recipients
Pulitzer Prize for Investigative Reporting winners
Place of birth missing (living people)
1967 births
Pulitzer Prize for International Reporting winners
New Rochelle High School alumni